Ngāitai is a Māori iwi (tribe) centred around Tōrere in the eastern Bay of Plenty of New Zealand.

See also
List of Maori iwi

References

 
Iwi and hapū